Doomed Battalion is a 1932 American drama film directed by Cyril Gardner and written by Karl Hartl, Patrick Kearney, Paul Perez and Luis Trenker. The film stars Luis Trenker, Tala Birell, Albert Conti, Victor Varconi, Henry Armetta and Gustav von Seyffertitz. The film was released on June 16, 1932, by Universal Pictures. Footage was used from the 1931 German film Mountains on Fire starring Trenker.

Cast 
Luis Trenker as Florian Di Mai
Tala Birell as Maria Di Mai
Albert Conti as Captain Kessler
Victor Varconi as Artur Franchini
Henry Armetta as Angelo
Gustav von Seyffertitz as Austrian General
C. Henry Gordon as Italian General
Gibson Gowland as Innerhofer

See also
 Mountains on Fire (1931)

References

External links 
 

1932 films
1930s war drama films
American war drama films
Universal Pictures films
Films directed by Cyril Gardner
American black-and-white films
Films set in the 1910s
Films set in Austria
Films set in Italy
Films set in the Alps
Films shot in Italy
World War I films set on the Italian Front
Mountaineering films
Films based on Austrian novels
Films based on Italian novels
American remakes of German films
American multilingual films
1932 multilingual films
1932 drama films
1930s English-language films
1930s American films